35 Sonnets is a collection of sonnets by Fernando Pessoa (Fernando António Nogueira Pessoa) published by the author in 1918.

Publication
The author sent copies to several British literary journals. There is no colophon supplying the actual date of printing of each book, but given the different printers employed, it may be assumed that some time elapsed between them.

Reception
35 Sonnets received fairly positive reviews from various British journals. A Glasgow Herald review was positive, but noted that the sonnets bore a "crabbedness of speech," likely due to an "imitation of a Shakespearean trick." However, a reviewer from the Times Literary Supplement said of 35 Sonnets that the author's "command of English is less remarkable than his knowledge of Elizabethan English."

References

External links
Public domain digital reproduction of the 1918 edition of 35 Poems.

Sources

The English Poetry of Pessoa

1918 poetry books
Fernando Pessoa
Portuguese poetry collections